Luís Alberto Silva dos Santos (born 17 November 1983), known as Luís Alberto, is a Brazilian former professional footballer who played as a midfielder.

He spent the better part of his 15-year senior career in Portugal, representing seven clubs.

Club career
Luís Alberto was born in Salvador, Bahia. In his country, he first played for Esporte Clube Bahia, Associação Desportiva São Caetano and Cruzeiro Esporte Clube, being part of Série A rosters with the first and last clubs, where he was often criticised for his propensity to be sent off. Additionally, he served a loan at Saudi Professional League club Ettifaq FC.

In late July 2008, Luís Alberto signed a five-year contract with C.D. Nacional of the Portuguese Primeira Liga, who acquired 50% of his sporting rights. He played his first game in the competition on 24 August, in a 3–1 away win against Leixões S.C. where he earned praise. His first goal came on 23 November in the 1–0 home victory over C.D. Trofense, and in his first year he also helped his team reach the semi-finals of the Taça de Portugal and qualify for the play-off round of the UEFA Europa League after a best-ever fourth-place finish.

Luis Alberto made his continental debut on 20 August 2009, opening the 4–3 home defeat of FC Zenit Saint Petersburg (eventually 5–4 on aggregate). In January 2012, he joined S.C. Braga of the same country and league on a three-and-a-half-year deal, being then consecutively loaned by that side to Romania's CFR Cluj and Esporte Clube Vitória in his country's top division. Whilst at Cluj, he memorably scored the only goal at Old Trafford against Manchester United in the group stage of the UEFA Champions League.

Following a brief spell in the Japanese J1 League, Luís Alberto returned to the Portuguese top division in July 2015, with C.D. Tondela. One year later, he moved to fellow league club G.D. Chaves.

Luís Alberto competed in the LigaPro until his retirement at the age of 35, representing in quick succession C.D. Aves, Académico de Viseu F.C. and Varzim SC.

Honours
Cruzeiro
Campeonato Mineiro: 2008

Vitória
Campeonato Baiano: 2013

References

External links

1983 births
Living people
Sportspeople from Salvador, Bahia
Brazilian footballers
Association football midfielders
Campeonato Brasileiro Série A players
Campeonato Brasileiro Série B players
Campeonato Brasileiro Série C players
Esporte Clube Bahia players
Associação Desportiva São Caetano players
Cruzeiro Esporte Clube players
Esporte Clube Vitória players
Saudi Professional League players
Ettifaq FC players
Primeira Liga players
Liga Portugal 2 players
C.D. Nacional players
S.C. Braga players
C.D. Tondela players
G.D. Chaves players
C.D. Aves players
Académico de Viseu F.C. players
Varzim S.C. players
Liga I players
CFR Cluj players
J1 League players
Kashima Antlers players
Brazilian expatriate footballers
Expatriate footballers in Saudi Arabia
Expatriate footballers in Portugal
Expatriate footballers in Romania
Expatriate footballers in Japan
Brazilian expatriate sportspeople in Saudi Arabia
Brazilian expatriate sportspeople in Portugal
Brazilian expatriate sportspeople in Romania
Brazilian expatriate sportspeople in Japan